Adamsville is an unincorporated community in Ontwa Township within Cass County in the U.S. state of Michigan.

History
Originally named Adamsport, the town was established in 1832. In 1838 it merged with Sage's Mill, a populated place on the other side of a creek.

Notes

Unincorporated communities in Cass County, Michigan
Unincorporated communities in Michigan
Populated places established in 1832
1832 establishments in Michigan Territory